Baba Hasan-e Jonubi (also Romanized as Bābā Ḩasan-e Jonūbī and Bābā Ḩasan-e Janūbī; also known as Bābā Ḩasanī, Bahasani, and Bah Ḩasanī) is a village in Liravi-ye Shomali Rural District, in the Central District of Deylam County, Bushehr Province, Iran. At the 2006 census, its population was 65, in 16 families.

References 

Populated places in Deylam County